Skandau (stylized as SkandaU) are a Bulgarian rap duo composed of Lachezar Evtimov and Yonislav Yotov (ToTo).

Career
The duo was created in 2010 by Lachezar Evtimov and Yonislav Yotov, both ex-footballers who decided to start a music career. Their first single Bread & Salt (Hlyab i Sol) was released in 2011. In 2012 they participated in the second season of Bulgaria's Got Talent where they reached the quarter finals. In 2013, after the success of their single Kush Kush they were the opening act of the Rick Rock concert in Plovdiv.

On 3 December 2016 they released their single Replay. The song currently runs over 10 million views on YouTube (Replay on Youtube). On 30 March 2017 they presented their collaboration song with VenZy - Sixth Sense (Shesto Chuvstvo). On May 10, 2017 they announced their song Mafia along with a month long tour by the same name.

They won the BG Radio Award for Best Bulgarian Band Of The Year in 2017 and 2018.

On 6th of April 2019 they did a concert in Armeets_Arena.

Members

Lachezar Evtimov
Lachezar Evtimov- (Лъчо) was born on 29 November 1992 in Kyustendil.

Yonislav Yotov
Yonislav Yotov-Toto was born on 29 June 1991 in Vratsa. He played in the football youth formations of Botev Vratsa and also Levski Sofia. In 2017 Toto entered the 9th season of the VIP Brother TV show. He won VIP Brother in 2017. 
He was learning in school №44 at the age from 7 to 18.

Discography

Other songs
 Hlyab I Sol (2011)
 Act-Wow (2012)
 TV I Radio (2012)
 Kush Kush (2013)
 Ot Iuni Do Avgust (feat. Deo) (2013)
 Ritamu (2013)
 Do Moreto (2014)
 Angeli I Demoni (2015)
 Zhiotno (with Liyubo) (2015)
 Reality (with Svetozar Hristov) (2015)
 Iskam Az (2015)
 Karambol (feat. Deo, Leo & Igrata) (2016)
 Mafia (2017)
 Kokaina (2018)
 Bez da pie (2018)
 Ale, ale (2020)

External links
Official website
Youtube Channel

References

Bulgarian musical groups
Musical groups established in 2010
2010 establishments in Bulgaria